Xinshi is a town under the administration of Mianzhu City in northern Sichuan, People's Republic of China, located about  south-southwest of downtown Mianzhu. , it has two residential communities and 13 villages under its administration.

References

Township-level divisions of Sichuan